Calliandra brevipes, the pink powderpuff, is an attractive shrub with finely divided leaves and clusters of red powder-puff flowers.  It is native to southeastern Brazil, Uruguay, and northern Argentina.

Portuguese common names include: Esponja, Esponjinha, Manduruvá, Quebra-foice. Botanical synonyms include Acacia selloi Spreng. and Calliandra selloi Macbr.

References

brevipes
Flora of Brazil
Taxa named by George Bentham